The Chorna rada of 1663 was a Cossack Rada meeting on 17–18 June, 1663 near Nizhyn, Ukraine, where thousands of common Cossacks, Zaporozhians, Ukrainian peasants, including the Cossack starshyna, where assembled to elect a new Hetman of Left-bank Ukraine. The main candidates were Acting hetman Yakym Somko, Nizhyn colonel Vasyl Zolotarenko, and Koshovyi Otaman Ivan Briukhovetsky. 
The starshyna proposed and supported Yakym Somko who was planning to reduce Muscovite influence in left-bank Ukraine, and restore Ukraine on both sides on the Dnipro, and Zolotarenko chose to support his opponent Somko as well. But the common Cossacks proposed Briukhovetsky, who promised to lower taxes. The tsar also supported Briukhovetsky's candidacy hoping to use him to increase Muscovite influence in the left-bank.  

The majority opted to elect Briukhovetsky who admired his proposed policies and elected him the new hetman. As disputes grew over the elections, the situation worsened for Somko and Zolotarenko and both sought protection from the Russian officials who were present as spectators. But the officers arrested them both and handed them over to the newly elected hetman. Briukhovetsky had them imprisoned, and executed in Borzna on September 28, 1663.

External links
encyclopedia of ukraine entry
Pereiaslav 1654: a historiographical study by John Basarab

Cossack Rada
1663 in Europe
17th century in the Zaporozhian Host